Carla Rueda Cotito (born April 19, 1990 in Chincha, Peru) is a Peruvian volleyball player who plays for the Peru national team. Rueda represented her country at the 2006 and 2010 World Championships.

Clubs
  Sporting Cristal (2006)
  Volley Murcia (2007)
  Deportivo Géminis (2007–2008)
  Riberense (2008–2009)
  Deportivo Géminis (2010–2011)
  Defense Force (2012)
  Deportivo Géminis (2012–2014)
  Azerrail Baku (2014–2015)
  Golem Volley Palmi (2015–2016)
  Deportivo Géminis (2016–2017)
  ASPTT Mulhouse (2017–2018)
  Deportivo Géminis (2018–2019)
  Pannaxiakos V.C. (2019–2020)
  Știința Bacău (2020)
  AJM/FC Porto (2021–2022)
  Diamond Food Volleyball Club (2022–2023)

References

External links
 FIVB Profile

1990 births
Living people
Volleyball players at the 2015 Pan American Games
Pan American Games competitors for Peru
Peruvian women's volleyball players
21st-century Peruvian women